Ratsasan is a 2018 Indian Tamil-language slasher psychological thriller directed by Ram Kumar. The film stars Vishnu Vishal, Amala Paul, and Saravanan while Kaali Venkat, Vinodhini Vaidyanathan, and Ramdoss play supporting roles. The film features music and background score composed by Ghibran, cinematography by P. V. Shankar and editing by San Lokesh.  The film tells the story of an aspiring film director who becomes a police officer after his father's death and tries to track down a serial killer.

The film was released on 5 October 2018 to generally positive critical reviews. It was remade in Telugu as Rakshasudu (2019) and in Hindi as Cuttputlli (2022).

Plot
In the opening scene, two elderly men discover a dead corpse of Samyuktha, a 15-year old school student, who was brutally murdered. Arun Kumar is an aspiring filmmaker who wants to make a movie on psychopaths. After multiple rejections and pressure from his family, Arun becomes a sub-inspector of police in the T.N.P.D, with the help of his brother-in-law, CI Das. He moves in with his sister Kokila, Doss and their daughter Ammu. Ammu gets into trouble in school and asks Arun for help, so he meets her teacher Viji at school, but later Das and Kokila catches Arun and Ammu. Slowly, Arun befriends Viji and her hearing and speech impaired niece, Kayal.

Meanwhile, Arun investigates the abduction of a school girl, Amudha. Arun finds similarities between Samyuktha and Amudha's case, due to the mutilations on a doll found at Amudha's house. But his attempts to convince his superior officer, ACP Lakshmi, go futile. A few days later, Amudha's mutilated corpse is found. The pathologist Dr. Nandan, suggests that the perpetrator followed a similar modus operandi like Samyuktha. Over the next few days, another hearing impaired girl named Meera, from Viji's school is abducted and killed. The search leads to Inbaraj, a teacher at the new school Ammu is enrolled. Inbaraj is a pedophile who forces girls into irrumatio. Ammu herself narrowly escapes Inbaraj when Arun nabs him after getting a tip off from another victim Sharmi.

Inbaraj admits to being a sexual predator but denies the murder charges. In a bid to escape, he holds Venkat, a policeman, at gunpoint, but Arun guns Inbaraj down. The same day, Ammu is abducted from her birthday party at home and Arun finds her mutilated corpse in their car trunk. Arun and Das becomes devastated on seeing her corpse. Das didn't tell Kokila that Ammu is dead, and they leaves back to their home. To make things worse, Arun is suspended for his negligence on shooting Inbaraj. Dejected and angry, Arun unofficially investigates the case himself with the help of a few policemen. Finding an audio clip from Meera's hearing aid, he traces a piano tune back to a lady magician Annabella George, who performed at all the victims' schools. Arun finds that Annabella picks students by randomly calling them on to the stage, she then follows, abducts and kills them within the next few days. Arun finds that the next target is a girl named Sanjana. He decides to save her. 

Despite constant surveillance, she is abducted. Arun and his team track her location and saves Sanjana. But Anabella manages to escape. Arun finds that Annabella was accused of murder a long time ago. He meets Rajamanickam, a retired cop, to collect information. Rajamanickam tells that Annabella's real name is Mary Fernandez and her son Christopher who has Werner Syndrome (progeria), a hormonal disorder that causes him to appear aged. Christopher performs magic tricks brilliantly and also plays piano well. He is an outcast at school, but a girl named Sophia befriends him. 

Christopher starts developing feelings for Sophia and he proposes to her, but he is heartbroken when she turns him down, since his condition has rendered him impotent and he cannot have a love life. Sophie also started avoiding him after this incident. Their conversation is overheard and Christopher is traumatized after many of the boys in his school humiliate him in the school. Mary learns of this and hacks Sophie to death, where she along with Christopher are arrested and sent to prison. They were believed to be dead in an accident, but Rajamanickam says that perhaps, Mary is still alive and has become a psychotic serial killer. Rajamanickam calls Arun to tell something important. Arun reaches Rajamanickam's house and finds him killed by Mary. He sees Rajamanickam's evidences but Lakshmi detains him and forbids him from following this case. 

Arun discovers that Rajamanickam had pieced information from photographs and he was going to about to say that actually it was Christopher disguised as Mary, who was long dead in an accident. He tries to reveal it to Lakshmi but fails. Meanwhile, Christopher attacks Viji and abducts Kayal. While trying to confronts Christopher, Venkat is killed. Kayal escapes and is found by Dr. Nandan, who tries to hide her in his facility, but Christopher kills Nandan. Arun tracks down Christopher on time, and after a prolonged fight, he manages to save Kayal and kill Christopher, but he gets injured in the fight. The media finally reports an end to the murders done by Christopher and Arun gets a chance to make a film about a psychopath fulfilling his dream.

Cast 

 Vishnu Vishal as SI Arun Kumar
 Amala Paul as Vijayalakshmi "Viji"
 Saravanan in double role as 
 Christopher Fernandez (Annabella George)
 Yasar as Young Christopher
 Mary Fernandez, Christopher's mother
 Kaali Venkat as Venkat
 Abhirami as Ammu, Arun's niece
 Baby Monica as Kayal, Viji's niece who lives with Arun and Viji
 Ramdoss as Doss, Arun's brother-in-law and Ammu's father
 Vinodhini Vaidyanathan as Kokila, Arun's sister and Ammu's mother
 Raveena Daha as Sharmi, Ammu's classmate
 Usha Elizabeth as Arun's mother
 Suzane George as ACP Lakshmi
 Nizhalgal Ravi as Dr. Nandan
 Sangili Murugan as Arun's house owner
 Ragavi Renu as Sophie, Christopher's love interest
 Trishala as Dual role Sanjana and Sangeetha, Sanjana's younger twin sister
 Priya as Meera
 Nehah Menon as Amudha
 Adhithri Dinesh as Samyuktha
 Vinod Sagar as Inbaraj
 Gajaraj as Gajaraj, Senior Police Officer
 Jai Anand as Anbarasu, Police Officer
 Thangam Paramanantham as Simon, Police officer
 Pasupathi as Pasupathi 
 Sanjay as Inspector Durai Raj
 Ravishankar as Amudha's father
 Rekha Padmanaban as Amudha's mother
 Akshay as Mahesh, Ammu's classmate also one who loves Ammu
 Kumar Das as Auto Driver Kumar, Inbaraj's helper
 Geetha Narayanan as Sanjana and Sangeetha's school principal
 Radha Ravi as Inspector Rajamanickkam (cameo appearance)
 Karunakaran as himself (cameo appearance)
 Ghibran as himself (cameo appearance)

Production 
Following the release of the comedy drama Mundasupatti (2014), Ramkumar was keen to do a serious film to avoid being type-cast. He was inspired to write a film on a psycho killer after reading an international news story about Alexander Spesivtsev, and spent close to a year writing a fictional screenplay to fit around the character of a psycho killer. Ramkumar initially struggled to find an actor to play the lead role of a forty-year-old man with a child, and despite working the child out of the script as a result, he still found it difficult to convince actors to sign the film. In April 2017, actor Jai signed the project titled Ratsasan, which was set to be produced by C. V. Kumar of Thirukumaran Entertainment. However, soon after the actor and director dropped out of the project, and producer took the title of Ratsasan with him. Subsequently, throughout the production stage, the film was briefly known as Cinderella and then Minmini, but neither title was kept. The former title was claimed by another Tamil film's producers, while Ramkumar felt the latter seemed too light-hearted. Eventually, the team members managed to amicably convince Kumar to offer them the title of Ratsasan.

Production began in November 2016, with principal photography starting in June 2017. Ramkumar chose to make the film with producer Dilli Babu and starring Vishnu in July 2017. Amala Paul joined the cast of the film in late November 2017, with production starting thereafter. In June 2017, the title of the film was changed to Ratsasan. in association with T-series.

Music

Soundtrack

Ghibran composed the soundtrack and background score of Ratsasan. He began composing the soundtrack in early 2017. He also finished composing the theme music for the film's teaser in August 2018. The album features four songs composed by Ghibran and lyrics written by Umadevi, Ramkumar, Ratnakumar and GKB. One song, Kaadhal Kadal Dhana, was released as a single on 15 September 2018. The song written by Umadevi and rendered by Sathyaprakash and Chaitra Ambadipudi received positive reviews from music listeners. It topped into the #1 position at the Radio Mirchi Top 20 Countdown, for nearly 4 weeks. Following that, a video song of the same was telecast on 30 September 2018, through Isaiaruvi channel at 4:30 p.m. IST.

The album was released on 27 September 2018, at the Suryan FM Radio Station, Chennai featuring the composer and other crew members present during the crew members present in the event. M Suganth from The Times of India, gave a positive review for the soundtrack and stated Kaadhal Kadal Dhana as "a romantic melody, a genre that Ghibran is a master at. Slow and lullaby-like, the persistent strings in the background are soothing, and despite distinct arrangements, the vocals are pronounced enough to make an impact."

Release

Theatrical
Ratsasan was released worldwide on 5 October 2018.

Home media
The satellite rights of the film were sold to Sun TV. It was dubbed and released in Malayalam language with the same title. The digital rights of the Malayalam version belongs to Disney+ Hotstar. The satellite rights of the Hindi dubbed version, which was titled as Main Hoon Dandadhikaari ( I am a police magistrate), was sold to Star India and had a TV premiere on Star Utsav Movies on 31 December 2019. The film was again telecasted a month later with full promotions on TV.

Reception 
Behindwoods wrote "Watch Ratsasan, the structured and engaging screenplay that makes it an intense psycho thriller", giving the movie 3.25/5. Times of India gave it a 3.5/5, stating that "Ratsasan is a competent thriller, for the most part. There is a tautness to the storytelling, especially until the interval block, that keeps us hooked." Sreedhar Pillai of Firstpost, rated 3 out of 5 stars, stating that "Vishnu Vishal's cop act is superlative but this thriller could've done with some trimming". India Today rated 3 out of 5 stars, and commented "Vishnu Vishal's 'Ratsasan' is one of the biggest releases in K-Town this week. The film is a carefully-written thriller, that has a few great moments, says our review." Film Companion South called it "If you turn a blind eye to the coincidences (say, the plot point around an autorickshaw) and the obvious red herrings (a suspected killer), the bulk of Ratsasan works. Ghibran's terrific score is the aural equivalent of bad airplane food — it makes your tummy queasy. After Mundasupatti and Ratsasan, I'm definitely pumped about what Ram Kumar has in store next". The News Minute, commented about the movie that "The film feels like a mix of all the psycho killer films you've seen before, but this surprisingly works for it."

Accolades

Remakes 
After the film's success, the makers decided to remake the film in Telugu, with actor Nithiin selected to reprise the role of Vishnu Vishal. But he opted out due to schedule conflicts, and was replaced by Bellamkonda Srinivas. Anupama Parameshwaran, was selected to play the female lead, reprising Amala Paul's role. The project was bankrolled by Havish under the banner A Studios, and was directed by Ramesh Varma. In March 2019, the film was titled Rakshasudu. The film was released in August 2019, to generally positive reviews.

The movie is also remade by Pooja Entertainment in Hindi directed by Ranjit Tiwari and stars Akshay Kumar, Sargun Mehta, Rakul Preet Singh and Chandrachur Singh. Earlier titled Mission Cinderella, the film premiered as Cuttputlli on Disney+ Hotstar on 2 September 2022.

References

External links 
 

2018 films
2010s Tamil-language films
2018 crime thriller films
Indian slasher films
Indian crime thriller films
Films shot in Chennai
Films shot in Ooty
Films scored by Mohamaad Ghibran
Tamil films remade in other languages
Indian serial killer films
Indian police films
2010s serial killer films
2010s slasher films